Mirosław Adamczyk (born 16 July 1962) is a Polish prelate of the Catholic Church who works in the diplomatic service of the Holy See.

Biography
Mirosław Adamczyk was born on 16 July 1962 in Gdańsk. He was ordained a priest for the Archdiocese of Gdańsk on 16 May 1987. He earned a degree in canon law and joined the diplomatic service of the Holy See on 1 July 1993. His early assignments took him to Madagascar, India, Hungary, Belgium, South Africa, and Venezuela.

On 22 February 2013, Pope Benedict XVI appointed him Apostolic Nuncio to Liberia and Titular Archbishop of Otricoli. He received his episcopal consecration from Cardinal Kazimierz Nycz on 27 April in the Cathedral of Oliwa.

Later in the year, Pope Francis gave him additional responsibilities as Apostolic Nuncio to the Gambia on 8 June and to Sierra Leone on 21 September.

On 12 August 2017, Pope Francis appointed him Apostolic Nuncio to Panama.

On 22 February 2020, Pope Francis appointed him Apostolic Nuncio to Argentina.

See also
 List of heads of the diplomatic missions of the Holy See

References

External links

 Catholic Hierarchy: Archbishop Mirosław Adamczyk 

1962 births
Living people
Apostolic Nuncios to Liberia
Apostolic Nuncios to Panama
Apostolic Nuncios to Sierra Leone
Apostolic Nuncios to the Gambia
Apostolic Nuncios to Argentina
Clergy from Gdańsk